"Skag Trendy" is the fourth single by Dundee band The View, it was released on 23 April 2007 as a double A-side along with "The Don". It follows the singles "Wasted Little DJs", "Superstar Tradesman" and "Same Jeans", and is taken from the debut album Hats Off to the Buskers. The single did not do as well as its predecessors, only reaching a disappointing #33 in the UK Singles Chart. One of the B-sides, "I've Just Seen a Face", is a Beatles cover.

Music video
The video for "Skag Trendy" features Gerard Kearns from Channel 4's TV Show Shameless depicting someone who has decided not to choose life.

Charts

Track listing
 UK CD
 "The Don"
 "Skag Trendy"
 "I've Just Seen a Face"
 "The Don (Video)"
 "Skag Trendy (Video)"

 UK 7" (green)
 "Skag Trendy"
 "The Don (Live from London Astoria)"
This is the only physical format with "Skag Trendy" as the actual A-side.

References

2007 singles
The View (band) songs
2007 songs
Songs written by Kyle Falconer
Songs written by Kieren Webster